Asygyna is a genus of Malagasy comb-footed spiders that was first described by I. Agnarsson in 2006.  it contains two species, found on Madagascar: A. coddingtoni and A. huberi.

See also
 List of Theridiidae species

References

Araneomorphae genera
Spiders of Madagascar
Theridiidae